The 2017 Norfolk County Council election took place on 4 May 2017 as part of the 2017 local elections in the United Kingdom.

The Conservative Party won control of the council from No Overall Control.

All three major parties made gains at the expense of the UK Independence Party and the Green Party of England and Wales, both of which lost all their seats. The Conservatives benefited the most, making a net gain of 15 seats from UKIP and the Liberal Democrats, while Labour bucked its national trend of poor results and made a net gain of 3 seats. The Liberal Democrats saw their seat number rise from 10 to 11, winning one off UKIP.  An independent candidate was also elected.

This was the first election since 2001 in which no UKIP or Green candidates were elected. The election saw significant changes in the popular vote, with UKIP's vote share declining by 17.5 percentage points and the Green Party winning just 4% of the county-wide vote, its worst result in Norfolk since the 1997 election.

Previous composition

2013 election

Composition of council seats before election

Changes between elections

In between the 2013 election and the 2017 election, the following council seats changed hands:

The leadership of the Council also changed from 2013. In May 2016, a Leadership election saw George Nobbs (Labour) removed as Council Leader and replaced with Cliff Jordan (Conservative). The vote was 41 for Cliff Jordan and 37 for George Nobbs.

Summary of Results

|-bgcolor=#F6F6F6
| colspan=2 style="text-align: right; margin-right: 1em" | Total
| style="text-align: right;" | 84
| colspan=5 |
| style="text-align: right;" |  233,869 
| style="text-align: right;" | 
|-

Election of Party Leaders

Cliff Jordan (Yare and All Saints) was re-elected leader of the Conservative Group. Steve Morphew (Catton Grove) challenged the incumbent group leader George Nobbs (Crome) for the leadership of the Labour Group and won. Marie Strong (Wells) who had been leader of the Liberal Democrat group, stood down and was replaced by Dan Roper (Hevingham and Spixworth) (with newly elected Steffan Aquarone (Melton Constable) as deputy leader of the group).

Election of Leader of the Council

Leader of the Conservative group, Cliff Jordan was re-elected Leader of the Council, and was able to form a majority Conservative administration.

He stood down in May 2018 after being diagnosed with lung cancer, and was replaced in June by Andrew Proctor (Blofield & Brundall), with Graham Plant (Gorleston St Andrews) replacing Alison Thomas (Long Stratton) as Deputy Leader. Less than a month after stepping down as Leader Cliff Jordan passed away on the 9 June.

Candidates and results by division

Breckland

District Summary

Division Results

Broadland

District Summary

Division Results

Great Yarmouth

District Summary

Division Results

King's Lynn and West Norfolk

District Summary

Division Results

†Alexandra Kemp was elected as a Labour councillor for Clenchwarton & King's Lynn South in September 2012 and reelected in May 2013, but left the party on 27 February 2014 to sit as an independent councillor.

North Norfolk

District Summary

Division Results

Norwich

District Summary

Division Results

South Norfolk

District Summary

Division Results

References

2017
2017 English local elections
2010s in Norfolk